Vanessa is a feminine given name.

It was invented by the Anglo-Irish writer Jonathan Swift for Esther Vanhomrigh, whom Swift had met in 1708 and whom he tutored. The name was created by taking "Van" from Vanhomrigh's last name and adding "Essa", a pet form of Esther. In 1726, the name Vanessa appeared in print for the first time in Cadenus and Vanessa, an autobiographical poem about Swift's relationship with Vanhomrigh. Swift had written the poem in 1713, but it was not published until three years after Vanhomrigh died.
Vanessa was adopted as the name of a genus of butterfly by Johan Christian Fabricius in 1807.

Vanessa was the 71st most popular name for girls born in the United States in 2007. It has been among the top 200 names for girls in the United States since 1953 and among the top 100 names for girls since 1977. It first appeared among the top 1,000 names for girls in the United States in 1950, when it appeared on the list in 939th place.

In Germany, Vanessa has been among the top 100 names for girls since 1976. The name became more and more popular and was the 7th most popular name for girls in the 1990s. In the following years its popularity dropped and the name is ranked in 42nd place for the decade 2000–2009.

Notable people with the given name 
 Vanessa Ament (born 1955), American foley artist and author
 Vanessa Amorosi (born 1981), Australian singer
 Vanessa Anderson, Australian teen whose death led to the Garling Report
 Vanessa Angel (English actress) (born 1966), English actress and model
 Vanessa Angel (Indonesian actress) (1992–2021), Indonesian actress, model and singer 
 Vanessa Baden (born 1985), American actress, writer, director, and producer
 Vanessa Barrs, Australian veterinary scientist
 Vanessa Bayer (born 1981), American actress, comedian and cast member from Saturday Night Live
 Vanessa Beecroft, Italian artist
 Vanessa Bell (1879–1961), English artist and the sister of author Virginia Woolf
 Vanessa Bell Armstrong (born 1953), American gospel singer
 Vanessa Bell Calloway (born 1957), American actress
 Vanessa Benelli Mosell, Italian pianist
 Vanessa Branch (born 1973), English-American model and actress
 Vanessa L. Brown (born 1966), Democratic member of the Pennsylvania House of Representatives who was convicted of bribery
 Vanessa Bryant (born 1982), American philanthropist, nonprofit executive, and former model
 Vanessa Carlton (born 1980), American singer, best known for her hit single "A Thousand Miles"
 Vanessa Coleman (born 1988), American criminal convicted of facilitating the kidnap, rape, and murder of Channon Christian
 Vanessa da Mata (born 1976), Brazilian singer
 Vanessa Djomo (born 1998), Cameroonian footballer
 Vanessa Downing (born 1958), Australian actress
 Vanessa Duriès (1972–1993), French writer
 Vanessa Erogbogbo, Ugandan economist
 Vanessa Feltz, English journalist and broadcaster
 Vanessa Ferlito, American actress
 Vanessa Ferrari (born 1990), Italian gymnast
 Vanessa García (born 1984), Puerto Rican freestyle swimmer
 Vanessa George, English paedophile convicted in the 2009 Plymouth child abuse case
 Vanessa Giacomo, Brazilian actress
 Vanessa Grigoriadis, American journalist
 Vanessa Heleta, women's rights activist and Special Olympics organiser from Tonga
 Vanessa Herrmann (born 1991), Thai actress and model
 Vanessa Hessler, American-Italian model and actress
 Vanessa Hudgens (born 1988), American actress and singer
 Vanessa Huppenkothen, Mexican model, actress, and presenter
 Vanessa King, Canadian actress
 Vanessa Kirby, British actress
 Vanessa Krasniqi (born 1994), Albanian-German singer
 Vanessa Koutouan (born 1988), Ivorian women's rights activist
 Vanessa Lachey (born 1980), American television personality, television host, and actress
 Vanessa Lengies (born 1985), Canadian actress
 Vanessa de Lisle, British fashion journalist
 Vanessa Lloyd-Davies (1960–2005), British doctor, equestrian and soldier
 Vanessa Mae (born 1978), Singapore-born British violinist and Olympic alpine skier
 Vanessa Mai (born 1992), German singer 
 Vanessa Marano (born 1992), American actress 
 Vanessa Marcil (born 1958), American actress
 Vanessa Marcotte (1989–2016), American murder victim
 Vanessa Marques (born 1996), Portuguese football player
 Vanessa Marquez (1968–2018), American actress
 Vanessa Marshall (born 1969), American actress and voice actress
 Vanessa Mdee (born 1988), Tanzanian singer and TV personality 
 Vanessa Merrell (born 1996), American actress (temporary role in Jane the Virgin) and YouTuber
 Vanessa Morgan (born 1992), Canadian actress
 Vanessa Paradis (born 1972), French actress and singer
 Vanessa Porto (born 1984), Brazilian mixed martial artist
 Vanessa Ray (born 1981), American actress
 Vanessa Redgrave (born 1937), English actress and political activist
 Vanessa Rousso (born 1983), American poker player
 Vanessa C. Tyson, American political scientist
 Vanessa Uri, birth name of Filipina actress Halina Perez (1983–2004)
 Vanessa Ward (née Browne) (born 1963), Australian high jumper
 Vanessa Watts (born 1987), West Indian cricketer
 Vanessa White (born 1989), English singer with The Saturdays
 Vanessa Estelle Williams (sometimes professionally Vanessa A. Williams) (born 1963), American actress
 Vanessa Williams (sometimes professionally Vanessa L. Williams) (born 1963), American model, singer, songwriter, and actress
 Vanessa R. Williams (born 1960), American gospel singer
 Vanessa Zahorian, American ballet dancer

Fictional characters 
 Vanessa (King of Fighters), a character in SNK Playmore's The King of Fighters video game series
 Vanessa (The Little Mermaid), a character in Disney's 1989 animated film The Little Mermaid, the name of the human form taken by the villain Ursula to seduce Prince Eric
 Vanessa Diodati, a character in the anime series Symphogear
 Vanessa Abrams, a character in the CW television series Gossip Girl
 Vanessa Chamberlain Lewis, a character from CBS' longest-running soap opera, Guiding Light
 Vanessa Doofenshmirtz, Dr. Doofensmirtz's daughter in the animated television series Phineas and Ferb
 Vanessa Fisk, wife of mobster Wilson Fisk, Kingpin of Crime in the Marvel Comic Universe
 Vanessa Gold, a character from the British soap opera, EastEnders
 Vanessa Huxtable, a character in the American television sitcom The Cosby Show
 Vanessa Ives, a character of tremendous power and importance in Penny Dreadful
 Vanessa "Nessa" Jenkins, from the British comedy series Gavin & Stacey
 Vanessa "Nessie" Kapatelis, supporting character in the Wonder Woman comic book series
 Vanessa Kensington, British secret agent from the 1997 film Austin Powers: International Man of Mystery
 Vanessa Lewis, a character in the Virtua Fighter video game series
 Vanessa Villante, a character from the Australian soap opera, Neighbours
 Vanessa Woodfield, a character from the British soap opera, Emmerdale
 Vanessa "Ness" Carlysle, supporting character from Deadpool
 Vanessa, a character from the animated series The Hollow
 Vanessa, a character in the 1989 Disney film The Little Mermaid
 Vanessa Van Helsing, the titular main character of the television series Van Helsing
 Vanessa Hysel, a character and minor antagonist in the 2018 Square Enix game Octopath Traveler
 Vanessa, the protagonist of the mobile rhythm game Cytus and central character in the sequel Cytus II
 Vanessa, the security guard in the 2021 game Five Nights at Freddy's: Security Breach

References

External links
 

English feminine given names
English given names invented by fiction writers
Feminine given names
Italian feminine given names
German feminine given names